The Stephen Foster House is a historic house in a rural area of Topsfield, Massachusetts.  It is a rare instance of a First Period house (built c. 1690) in which its original footprint is still readily discernible, and has not been obscured by subsequent modifications.  The only immediately overt exterior indication of the house's great age is the steep pitch of its roof.  It is a -story wooden house framed with massive oak timbers.  It is a "single cell" house, only three asymmetrically placed window bays wide and one room deep, with a chimney on the left side.  Its exterior was complete restyled in a 19th-century vernacular style.

The house was listed on the National Register of Historic Places in 1990.

See also
List of the oldest buildings in Massachusetts
National Register of Historic Places listings in Essex County, Massachusetts

References

Houses in Topsfield, Massachusetts
Houses on the National Register of Historic Places in Essex County, Massachusetts